Ruby Throat is a British neofolk musical duo formed in 2007 by English vocalist KatieJane Garside and American guitarist Chris Whittingham. The duo were formed during the dissolution of Garside's former band, Queenadreena, and have recorded four studio albums. In 2020, Garside and Whittingham  released music together under the name "Liar, Flower".

History
Ruby Throat formed in 2007 during the time in which KatieJane Garside's band Queenadreena was in stages of dissolution. Garside met Whittingham, an American from Hawaii while he was busking at a train platform in the London Underground, and asked him to collaborate with her on a musical project.

Known for the hard-edged musical aesthetic of Garside's former bands Daisy Chainsaw and Queenadreena, Garside sought a stripped down, folk-oriented sound when forming Ruby Throat, with many of the duo's songs being based around acoustic guitar, and evoking a folk noir sound.

The duo's first release was The Ventriloquist (2007). The album was well-received, and critics drew comparisons to the work of PJ Harvey and others. PopMatters said of the album: "Garside’s breathy, nearly childlike voice is the dominant element of The Ventriloquist, gentle acoustic guitars and lap steels setting the stage for her voice. Despite the somber lyrical themes, this is a clear heir to the lineage of ethereal makeout albums like those from Mazzy Star and the Cocteau Twins."

This was followed by a Tour EP and Out of a Black Cloud Came a Bird (2009), their second studio album, which featured a cover of "Nothing" by Townes Van Zandt. To promote the record, the duo embarked on their first tour of the United States, performing shows in New York City, Oregon, California, and Washington.

In 2012, they released their third studio album, O' Doubt O' Stars, which was written and recorded while the duo were sailing on the Lea River and North London waterways. PopMatters said of the album: "Beginning with the quietly devastating epic “Stone Dress”, it's clear that O’ Doubt O’ Stars is aiming for something uncompromising and original. The fact that it succeeds in accomplishing this as much as it does is no small feat and makes it worthy of any accolades it will (and should) receive." Each of the group's releases have receive hand-crafted packaging, artwork, and sometimes personal handwritten lyrics and other accompaniments from Garside.

Garside and partner Whittingham spent 2012 living on their yacht, Iona. In 2014 they released a new song, a cover of "Secret Fires" by The Gun Club, which appeared on the third Jeffrey Lee Pierce Sessions compilation Axels & Sockets. It was announced on 1 August 2014 that Ruby Throat's fourth album would be called Baby Darling Toporo, eventually released in 2017.

Ruby Throat released Stone Dress in 2018, a compilation of some of the band's favorite tracks from the last 4 albums along with a bonus CD titled Liar, Flower. The duo went on to release the 2020 album Geiger Counter under the new moniker Liar, Flower.

Discography

Studio albums

Extended plays

Compilation albums

Singles

Members
KatieJane Garside - vocals
Chris Whittingham - backing vocals, guitar, mandolin, lap steel guitar, sitar

References

English alternative rock groups
English folk musical groups
English musical duos
Freak folk
Musical groups established in 2007
Musical groups from London
Folk music duos